Sid Ahmed Ould Bneijara (1947 – 30 August 2017) was the 4th Prime Minister of Mauritania from December 12, 1980 to April 25, 1981.

Biography 
He had a short term as the governor of Central Bank of Mauritania in summer 1978.

He was first appointed by Col. Mohamed Khouna Ould Haidallah of the Military Committee for National Salvation (CMSN), on December 12, 1980, to replace Haidallah himself. Ould Bneijara, who was not a military man, was to lead the return to civilian government.

On April 25, 1981, less than five months later, Ould Bneijara was again dismissed, after Col. Haidallah had decided to reinstate military rule. This came as a result of the March 18 attempt at a coup d'état by the Alliance for a Democratic Mauritania (AMD). His successor, Col. Maaouya Ould Sid'Ahmed Taya, on 12 December 1984 depose Col. Haidallah and himself rule the country until 2005. 

Ould Bneijara died in the country of Spain.

References

1947 births
2017 deaths
Prime Ministers of Mauritania
Mauritanian bankers
Central bankers